Firestone is a surname. Notable people with the surname include:

Harvey Firestone family
Harvey Samuel Firestone (1868–1938), founder of Firestone Tire and Rubber Company
Harvey Samuel Firestone, Jr., son of Firestone founder
Elizabeth Parke Firestone, daughter-in-law of Harvey Firestone and mother of Martha Firestone
Leonard Firestone, son of founder Harvey Firestone
Brooks Firestone, son of Leonard Firestone
Andrew Firestone, great-grandson of founder Harvey Firestone and the son of Brooks Firestone
Nick Firestone, racing car driver

Others
Dennis Firestone, CART driver, 1979–1987
Floyd Firestone, American acoustical physicist
George Firestone, American politician, Secretary of State of Florida 1979–1987
Nancy B. Firestone (1951-2022), United States Court of Federal Claims judge
Roy Firestone, sports journalist
Shulamith Firestone (1945–2012), Jewish Canadian-born feminist
Tirzah Firestone, rabbi

English-language surnames
Jewish surnames